Schleicher Independent School District is a public school district based in Eldorado, Texas (USA). The district's boundaries parallel that of Schleicher County.  In 2009, the school district was rated "academically acceptable" by the Texas Education Agency.

Schools
The district has three campuses -

Eldorado High School (Grades 9-12), 
Eldorado Middle School (Grades 5-8) 
Eldorado Elementary School (Grades PK-4).

References

External links
Schleicher ISD

School districts in Schleicher County, Texas